The 2003 Strauss Canada Cup of Curling was held January 8–12, 2003, at Sport Mart Place in Kamloops, British Columbia. The winning teams received berths into the 2005 Canadian Olympic Curling Trials, the 2003 Continental Cup of Curling and the 2004 Canada Cup of Curling. It was the inaugural edition of this event.

The winners were Randy Ferbey, who pocketed $53,000 after defeating John Morris, 7-5 in the men’s final and Sherry Middaugh, who earned $52,250 after beating Kelley Law, 8-7 in the women’s final.

Men's event

Teams
The men's teams were as follows:

Preliminary round
Final standings

Tiebreaker

Playoffs

Women's event

Teams
The women's teams were as follows:

Preliminary round
Final standings

Tie breaker
 Kelly Scott 6, Sherry Anderson 5

Playoffs

References

External links
 
 

2003 in British Columbia
Canada Cup (curling)
Sport in Kamloops
2003 in Canadian curling
Curling in British Columbia
January 2003 sports events in Canada